Staniforth Road is located in Sheffield, England. It connects the Attercliffe and Darnall areas of the city.

Historically the road has been used as a shopping street, with notable businesses being present over the years, including 2 cinemas, the Regal near Attercliffe Road and the Balfour. The road features a bridge that crossed over the Sheffield & Tinsley Canal.

On 25 October 2018 a Sheffield Stagecoach Supertram operating on the newly opened Tram-Train route collided with a lorry at the Staniforth Road/Woodburn Road junction. It is believed the lorry ran a red light. Several people were taken to hospital but there were no fatalities. No action was taken against the driver of the lorry.

Name
The road is named for Samuel Staniforth Esq. who built and resided at Darnall Hall. The Staniforth family were present in Darnall and Attercliffe for centuries.

References

Streets in Sheffield